Yang Hui (born 15 March 1967) is a Chinese ice dancer. He competed in the ice dance event at the 1992 Winter Olympics with Han Bing.

References

1967 births
Living people
Chinese male ice dancers
Olympic figure skaters of China
Figure skaters at the 1992 Winter Olympics
Place of birth missing (living people)